(born February 23, 1972 in Tochigi) is a retired boxer from Japan, who competed for his native country at the 1992 Summer Olympics in Barcelona, Spain.

Japan sent four boxers to the Barcelona Games. Kawakami competed in the Men's Welterweight (– 67 kg) division. He was defeated in his first match by Great Britain's Adrian Dodson after the referee stopped the contest in the third round.

References
Profile

1972 births
Living people
People from Tochigi, Tochigi
Sportspeople from Tochigi Prefecture
Welterweight boxers
Boxers at the 1992 Summer Olympics
Olympic boxers of Japan
Japanese male boxers
20th-century Japanese people
21st-century Japanese people